Mabel "Lula" Lapacó (1930–2016) was an Argentinian modernist architect known for her Brutalist buildings.

Lapacó studied architecture at the University of Buenos Aires. At the school she met Osvaldo Bidinost, who later became her husband and occupational partner.

Mabel Lapacó died on January 22, 2016, in Buenos Aires.

Work 

 Escuela Superior de Comercio Manuel Belgrano (1959), Córdoba
 Casa Lapacó (1961), Tres Cruces 
 Casa Goldstein (1967), Pinamar

References 

1930 births
2016 deaths
Argentine women architects
20th-century Argentine architects
Brutalist architects
People from Buenos Aires